Grover is an unincorporated community in Seward County, Nebraska, United States.

History
A post office was established at Grover in 1885, and remained in operation until it was discontinued in 1908. The community was named for President Grover Cleveland.

References

Unincorporated communities in Seward County, Nebraska
Unincorporated communities in Nebraska